Edward Charles Judie (born July 6, 1959) is a former American football linebacker who played college football for Northern Arizona (1977–1980) and professional football in the National Football League (NFL) for the San Francisco 49ers (1982-1983), the Tampa Bay Buccaneers (1983), and Miami Dolphins (1984). He appeared in 24 NFL games, eight of them as a starter.

Early years
Judie was born in 1959 in Tyler, Texas, and attended Tempe High School in Tempe, Arizona. He played college football for the Northern Arizona Lumberjacks from 1977 to 1980.

Professional football
He signed with the San Francisco 49ers in 1981 but spent the year on injured reserve. During the 1982 and 1983 seasons, he appeared in 11 games, three as a starter.

He was acquired by the Tampa Bay Buccaneers during the 1983 season. He appeared in 11 games for Tampa Bay, 11 of them as a starter.

In 1984, he signed with the Miami Dolphins late in the season. He appeared in two games for the Dolphins.

References

1959 births
Living people
American football linebackers
San Francisco 49ers players
Tampa Bay Buccaneers players
Miami Dolphins players
Northern Arizona Lumberjacks football players
Sportspeople from Tyler, Texas
Players of American football from Texas